New Asyut is a city in Asyut Governorate, Egypt. It was established in 2000.

See also

 List of cities and towns in Egypt

References

Populated places in Asyut Governorate
Cities in Egypt
New towns in Egypt